Helgi and Finnbogi (Old Norse: , ; Modern Icelandic:) were two merchant brothers from Iceland, born in the late 10th century AD.

Biography
The Saga of the Greenlanders describes them as coming to Greenland one summer. There they negotiated a deal with Freydis Eiriksdottir, agreeing to share the profits of a voyage to newly discovered Vinland. Each agreed to take 30 crewmembers, but Freydis secretly took more.

In Vinland, there was tension between the two groups. Helgi and Finnbogi set up a settlement separate from Freydis and her crew. Freydis eventually went to the brothers' hut and asked how they were faring. "Well," responded the brothers, "but we do not like this ill-feeling that has sprung up between us." The two sides made peace.

Freydis, once outside, beat herself so that it would appear as if she had been ill-treated. When she returned to her husband, he asked who had beaten her. Freydis claimed Helgi and Finnbogi were the culprits, and, calling him a coward, demanded that he exact revenge on her behalf, or else she would divorce him. He gathered his men and killed Helgi and Finnbogi, as well as the men in their camp. When he refused to kill the women, Freydis herself picked up an axe and massacred them. When she returned to Greenland, she told her brother Leif Eiriksson that Helgi and Finnbogi had decided to stay in Vinland.

References

Magnús Magnússon and Hermann Pálsson (translators) (2004). Vinland Sagas. Penguin Books. . First ed. 1965.

11th-century Vikings
10th-century Icelandic people
10th-century merchants
11th-century merchants
Norse colonization of North America